This is a list of all engines produced or used by Mitsubishi Fuso Truck and Bus Corporation. All engines are Diesel if not stated otherwise.

Gasoline engines

The JH4 was an F-head engine based on the Willys Hurricane engine and its predecessor Willys Go-Devil sidevalve four, and was used to power early Mitsubishi Jeeps as well as Mitsubishi Fuso trucks and buses.

Several other engines had been taken over from Mitsubishi Motors.

Diesel engines

KE series
Mainly fitted to the Mitsubishi Jeep, this engine has its roots in the JH4 design. The six-cylinder KE36 with 3.3 L is based on the KE31.

4DQx
Fitted to the T720 Mitsubishi Canter from 1963 on (as the 4DQ11A), this engine was replaced by the 4DR1 in 1968.

4DRx
 4DR1 2384 cc, OHV, 2 valves per cylinder, crossflow cylinder head design. Bore and stroke is 88 x 98 mm. Introduced in June 1968 for the T90-series Canter.
 4DR5/6 2659 cc, Bore and stroke is 92 x 100 mm. The 4DR5 has indirect injection and 20:1 compression ratio. Both of these engines were used in large forklift trucks, as well as Canter models and the Mitsubishi J20 and J50 series Jeep. The final iteration of the 4DR5 fitted to the J25 Jeep had 21.5:1 compression and was turbocharged and intercooled, developing 100PS.
 4DR7 2835 cc, peak power is  - according to some, this is a 2.5 L with

4D3x
The 4D3x is a series of 4 cylinder ohv diesel engines.
 4D30 3298 cc, bore 100 mm x stroke 105 mm, naturally aspirated, indirect injection . European models claimed  DIN.
 4D31 3298 cc, bore 100 mm x stroke 105 mm, Naturally aspirated or turbo charged, direct injection,
 4D32 3567 cc, bore 104 mm x stroke 105 mm, 
 4D33 4214 cc, bore 108 mm x stroke 115 mm, naturally aspirated, ohv gear driven camshaft, direct injection with in-line injection pump. In the Canter trucks (General export model) this engine serves as a standard and outputs  at 3200 rpm resp. 304 Nm at 1600 rpm, but output may vary slightly on other trucks/in other markets due to e.g. indicating gross power .
 4D34 3907 cc, bore 104 mm x stroke 115 mm, turbo charged. In 2017 the 4D34 engines, e.g. in the Philippines, comply with Euro 2. In Europe they were replaced with the introduction of Euro 5. The turbocharged T4 has . Known versions:
 4D34-2AT4,  at 2900 rpm, 370 Nm at 1600 rpm, option on Canter 6.0 - 8.2 t (General export model)
 4D34-2AT5,  at 2900 rpm, 275 Nm at 1600 rpm, option on Canter 4.4 - 6.0 t (General export model)
 4D34-2AT7,  at 2900 rpm, 373 Nm at 1600 rpm, Canter 8.25 t (General export model Indonesia)
 4D34-2AT8,  at 2900 rpm, 324 Nm at 1600 rpm, Canter 7.5 t (General export model Indonesia)
 4D35 4.56 L, 
 4D36 3.56 L
4D37 3907 cc, Common Rail, four valves per cylinder, ohv gear driven camshaft
 100 kW at 2500 rpm, 420 Nm at 1500 rpm
 ~2020- Fuso FA/FI, Euro IV/V with SCR
 125 kW at 2500 rpm, 520 Nm at 1500 rpm

4M4x

 4M40 - 2835 cc. Inline-four cylinder, ohc, natural aspiration and swirl combustion. Introduced with the 6th generation of the Canter in September 1996 the engine produces  and 191 Nm at 2000 rpm. The injection pump may be of the rotary type. Late engines complied to Euro 2. It replaced the 2.5-liter 4D56 in the lightest-duty Canters.
 4M41 - this engine is of 3200 cc. Four cylinders, DOHC, swirl combustion and a rotary injection pump. They complied to Euro 2 and were equipped to the Canter from 02/1999 thru 09/2001 producing 85 kW and 216 Nm at 2000 rpm.
 4M42-AOT - 2977 cc. Another 4 cylinder with dohc, direct injection, a Bosch VP44 rotary injection pump with electronic control, turbocharging and intercooling. With EGR they complied to Euro 3 and were equipped to the Canter from 09/2001 performing 92 kW at 3200 rpm and 294 Nm at 1800 rpm. Starting from 10/2007 the engine was modified to common rail injection, VNT charging and a Diesel particulate filter was added to meet Euro 4. On the Canter they were replaced by the 4P10 in 07/2009.

4M5x
The 4M50 is a series of 4 cylinder diesel engines with 4899 cc, bore x stroke 114 x 120mm, gear driven DOHC 4 valves per cylinder and common rail direct injection with turbocharging and intercooler.
 4M50-T3 - 103 kW, 412 Nm
 02/2004- Mitsubishi Fuso Canter 
 4M50-4AT4 - 110 kW at 2700 rpm, 441 Nm at 1600 rpm
 4M50-T4 - 118 kW, 470 Nm
 02/2004- Mitsubishi Fuso Canter
 4M50-T5 or 4M50-5AT5 - 132 kW at 2700 rpm, 530 Nm at 1600 rpm
 02/2004- Mitsubishi Fuso Canter
 Rosa
 10/2004-06/2008 Nissan Civilian

The 4M51 is a 4 cylinder diesel engine with 5249 cc,

4P1x
The 4P10 is a 2998 cc turbodiesel engine purchased by Daimler from FPT Industrial for the Mitsubishi Fuso Canter since 2009/2010. Essentially it is an FPT F1C. The 4P10 with Common rail fuel system with high pressure piezo-injectors meets Euro 6 emission norms with Bluetec selective catalytic reduction system and was introduced as the new "Global Powertrain" for the Canter. Since the "General Export Modells" remained with the old Mitsubishi engines the utilization of the "Global Powertrain" was limited to highly developed countries with strict exhaust gas emission limitations, e.g. Japan (starting with the 8th generation of the Canter only), Europe and North America. In 2020, a revised version with improvements on torque, fuel economy and exhaust gas emissions appeared in Japan for the Canter under the denomination 4P10+.
 4P10T2 -   at 3500 rpm,  at 1300 rpm in Europe, 
 4P10T4 -   at 3500 rpm,  at 1320 rpm in Europe
 4P10T5 -   at 3400 rpm,  at 1300 rpm, 2 turbochargers in NFTA
 4P10T6 -   at 3500 rpm,  at 1600 rpm in Europe
 4P10T1+ -   at 2130 rpm,  Nm at 1600 rpm, in Japan for Canter 1.5 tons
 4P10T2+ -   at 2130 rpm,  Nm at 1600-2130 rpm, in Japan for Canter 
 4P10T4+ -   at 2440 rpm,  Nm at 1600-2440 rpm, in Japan for Canter 
 4P10T6+ -   at 2860 rpm,  Nm at 1600-2860 rpm, in Japan for Canter

 Applications
 Mitsubishi Fuso Canter
 Mitsubishi Fuso Rosa
 Nissan Civilian
 Temsa Prestij
 Mitsubishi Jeep line

4V2x
bore 104 x stroke 115 mm, 3907 cc, ohv gear driven camshaft, based on the 4D37 engine. common rail direct injection, turbo intercooled
 4V20 125 kW @ 2500, 520Nm @ 1500, with SCR and DPF 
 ~2020- Fuso Fighter JDM 
 4V21 100 kW @ 2500, 420Nm @ 1500, Euro IV
 ~2020- Fuso Canter Export Modell based on Gen8

Six Cylinder

KE series
Mostly a six-cylinder version of the KE31, this engine saw use in the heavier (3.5 ton) version of the Mitsubishi Jupiter.

DB series
 DB5A, peak power is 
 DB31A, peak power is 
Also called 6DB10A, and in turbocharged form (6DB1AT) it produces . The turbo version first appeared in 1965.

DH series
 The inline-six DH-series diesel engines were used in heavy-duty trucks beginning in 1952 with the W21.

6DCx
This engine has the same internal dimensions as the eight-cylinder 8DC2 and was first introduced in 1967 with indirect injection, Mitsubishi Fuso F-series.

6DRx
Bore and stroke is 92 x 100 mm (as for the 4DR5). A forklift version only has  at 2200 rpm.
 Applications:
 Mitsubishi Fuso Canter
 Mitsubishi Fuso Rosa
 Mitsubishi Fuso Jupiter T44
 1978-1979 Dodge D100/D200

6DSx
 6DS1 4678 cc, peak power is from 
 6DS3, peak power is 
 6DS5, peak power is from 
 6DS7 5430 cc, peak power is

6D1x
The T3 has .
 6D16-1A turbocharged,  @ 2900rpm and 520 Nm @ 1400rpm
 6D16-3AT3 turbocharged, intercooled,  @ 2600rpm and  @ 1400rpm
 6D16-T2 220ps/2800rpm 687N•m/1400rpm, Fuso Fighter
 6D16-T5 turbocharged, 
 6D16-T7 255ps, Fuso Fighter
 6D17 8201 cc, bore 118 x stroke 125 mm, peak power is  while the cleaner 6D17-II has , 225ps on Fuso Fighter

6D2x
 6D22 11,149 cc 
 naturally aspirated , Mitsubishi Fuso The Great
 6D22-T0 , The Great
 6D22-T1 , The Great
 6D22-T2 , The Great
 6D22-T6 , The Great
 6D22-T7 , 1988 
 6D24 11,945 cc, bore x stroke is 130 x 150 mm, ohv, gear driven camshaft, direct injection with in-line injection pump
 naturally aspirated  at 2,200 rpm,  at 1,400 rpm
 6D24-T? , Mitsubishi Fuso The Great
 6D24-T2  at 2,200 rpm,  at 1,400 rpm, Mitsubishi Fuso Super Great

6D3x
 4.9 L - 5.9 L

6D4x
 6D40 12,023 cc, 24 valves, bore x stroke is 135mm x 140mm, 
 6D40-T1 turbocharged+intercooled  or  @ 2200,  @ 1200, Mitsubishi Fuso Super Great
 6D40-T2 turbocharged+intercooled  @ 2200,  @ 1200, Mitsubishi Fuso Super Great
 6D40-T3 VGT-charged , Mitsubishi Fuso The Great

6M6x
 6M60 - 7,545 cc, bore x stroke is 118mm x 115mm, in-line six cylinder turbo charged and intercooled diesel engine, gear driven SOHC, common rail injection., successor of the 6D16 engine, 2010 ~ present JDM version, 2018 on Fuso Fighter in South Africa
 6M60-T3 - peak power is 220ps/2200rpm ,torque is 745N•m/1400~2000rpm (Fighter) 
 6M60-T4 - 162 kW at 2070 rpm, 745 Nm at 950-2070 rpm, on ~2020- Japanese Fighter
 6M60-T5 - 177 kW at 2270 rpm, 745 Nm at 950-2270 rpm, on ~2020- Japanese Fighter
 6M60-T6 - 199 kW at 2500 rpm, 785 Nm at 1100-2400 rpm, on ~2020- Japanese Fighter

6M7x
 6M70 12,882 cc, bore x stroke is 135mm x 150mm, First Version:

 6M70 Second Version:

6R1x
 6R10  12,808 cc, bore x stroke is 132mm x 156mm, mutually developed with Daimler OM 471, in contrast to OM471 with a conventional turbo charger the 6R10 features a VGT.
 6R10-T5, Mitsubishi Fuso Super Great

6R2x
The 6R20 is a series of 6 cylinder in-line diesel engine with 10,677 cc, bore 125mm x stroke 145mm, mutually developed with Daimler OM 470.
 2017- Aero Queen
 2017- Ace Tour
 6R20T2  @ 1600 rpm,  @ 1100 rpm
 2017- SuperGreat

6S1x
 6S10  7,698 cc, bore x stroke is 110mm x 135mm, mutually developed with Daimler OM 936
 used on 2017- SuperGreat, 2017- Aero Queen, 2017- Ace Tour

6S2x
The 6S2x is a series of 6,373 cc 6 cylinder turbo charged and intercooled diesel engines with 3 valves per cylinder, ECU, direct injection and inline injection pump. In 2020 they comply to Euro IV/V with the help of SCR. Related to Mercedes Benz OM906.
 6S20-T1  @ 2,200 rpm,  @ 1,200-1800 rpm
 ~2020- Fuso FZ
 6S20-T2  @ 2,200 rpm,  @ 1,200-1600 rpm
 ~2020- Fuso FO
 ~2020- Fuso FZ
  @ 2,200 rpm,  @ 1,200-1600 rpm
 ~2020- Fuso FJ

Eight Cylinder

8DCxx
 8DC2 13,273 cc , indirect injection, Mitsubishi Fuso F-series. 
 8DC20AD .
 8DC4 13,273 cc , direct injection, Mitsubishi Fuso F-series.
 8DC6 14,886 cc , indirect injection, Mitsubishi Fuso F-series, Mitsubishi Fuso The Great
 8DC7 13,804 cc , direct injection, Mitsubishi Fuso F-series.
 8DC8 14,886 cc , direct injection, Mitsubishi Fuso F-series, Mitsubishi Fuso The Great
 8DC9 16,031 cc, 135 x 140 mm
 naturally aspirated  @ 2200,  @ 1400, Mitsubishi Fuso The Great, Mitsubishi Fuso Super Great
 8DC9T  (turbo), Mitsubishi Fuso The Great
 8DC9-T2 twinturbocharged+intercooled,  @ 2200,  @ 1300, Mitsubishi Fuso The Great, Mitsubishi Fuso Super Great
 8DC10 16,752 cc , Mitsubishi Fuso The Great
 8DC11 17,737 cc, 142 x 140 mm 
 8DC11-1 naturally aspirated,  @ 2100,  @ 1300, Mitsubishi Fuso Super Great
 8DC11-2 naturally aspirated,  @ 2200,  @ 1300, Mitsubishi Fuso The Great, Mitsubishi Fuso Super Great
 8DC11-3 naturally aspirated,  @ 2200,  @ 1300, Mitsubishi Fuso Super Great

8M2x
 8M20  10,089 cc, 146 x 150 mm
 8M20-1 naturally aspirated,  @2200,  @ 1300, Mitsubishi Fuso The Great, Mitsubishi Fuso Super Great
 8M20-2 naturally aspirated,  @2200,  @ 1300, The Great, Mitsubishi Fuso Super Great
 8M20-3 naturally aspirated,  @2200,  @ 1300, The Great, Mitsubishi Fuso Super Great
 8M21  21,205 cc, 150 x 150 mm
 8M21-1 naturally aspirated,  @2200,  @ 1200, Mitsubishi Fuso Super Great
 8M21-2 naturally aspirated,  @2200,  @ 1200, Mitsubishi Fuso Super Great
 8M21-3 naturally aspirated,  @2200,  @ 1300, The Great, Mitsubishi Fuso Super Great
 8M21-4 naturally aspirated,  @2200,  @ 1200, Mitsubishi Fuso Super Great
 8M22 19,004 cc, 142 x 150 mm
 8M22-T1 twinturbo+intercooler,  at 2,000 rpm,  at 1,100 rpm, Mitsubishi Fuso Super Great
 8M22-T2 twinturbo+intercooler,  at 2,000 rpm,  at 1,100 rpm, Mitsubishi Fuso Super Great

Ten Cylinder

10DCx
The ten-cylinder 10DC engines share the dimensions of the 8DC series and were first seen in 1974, in the heavy duty F-series trucks.
 10DC6 18,608 cc,  at 2500 rpm.
 10DC8 18,608 cc, direct injection, Mitsubishi Fuso F-series.

10M2x
 10M20 25,112 cc, 146 x 150 mm, naturally aspirated,  at 2,200 rpm,  at 1,300 rpm, Mitsubishi Fuso The Great, Mitsubishi Fuso Super Great
 10M21 26,507 cc, 150 x 150 mm, naturally aspirated,  at 2,200 rpm,  at 1,200 rpm, Mitsubishi Fuso Super Great

Twelve Cylinder
This is essentially two coupled 6DC2 six-cylinder engines.

See also
Mitsubishi Motors engines

References

Fuso (company)
Mercedes-Benz Group engines
Mitsubishi Fuso
Straight-six engines